The Basketball competition in the 1963 Summer Universiade was held in Porto Alegre, Brazil.

Men's competition

Final standings

References

External links
List of medal winners

Basketball
Summer Universiade
1963
Universiade